The Common  Mechanism (CBM) connects habitable elements in the US Orbital Segment (USOS) of the International Space Station (ISS). The CBM has two distinct sides that, once mated, form a cylindrical vestibule between modules. At least one end of the vestibule is often limited in diameter by a smaller bulkhead penetration.

Latches and bolts on the Active CBM (ACBM) side pull fittings and floating nuts on the Passive CBM (PCBM) side to align and join the two.

After the vestibule is pressurized, crew members clear a passage between modules by removing some CBM components. Utility connectors are installed between facing bulkheads, with a closeout panel to cover them.  The resulting tunnel can be used as a loading bay, admitting large payloads from visiting cargo spacecraft that would not fit through a typical personnel passageway.

Design overview

All CBM types feature an aluminum ring that is bolted onto the pressure shell during fabrication of the parent . The bolted joint compresses two concentric o-ring seals: one is silicone (for better temperature performance), and the other is fluorocarbon (for better resistance to scrubbing). If the primary seals deteriorate, they can be augmented by secondary seals that were designed and qualified as part of the CBM.

Most of the vestibule's volume is reserved for crew passage, and a closeout is typically installed around the perimeter of the hatch as a boundary for the passageway.  In most locations, volume is reserved for utility connections outboard of the closeout. The set of utilities is specific to each pair of mated modules.

In addition to its structural characteristics, the ACBM performs and reverses the basic functions associated with berthing:

Alignment physically constrains motion between the modules in five of the six degrees of freedom as the distance between them changes.  The constraints are imposed by successive sets of structural components.
An indication of readiness to operate Capture Latches is provided to the RMS operator when the in-coming module has been correctly placed within reach of the latches.  Ready-to-Latch Indication is provided by four mechanisms: one in each quadrant, associated with each latch.
The incoming module is captured by four latches.  They draw it through a combined rotation and translation to align the PCBM to the ACBM with a small residual gap.
A rigid structural connection is established.  Each of 16 powered bolts on the ACBM crosses the residual gap to thread into a nut on the PCBM.  The bolts are tightened in a multi-stage process that gradually conforms the two flanges, compresses the CBM/CBM seals, and  the CBM/CBM joint.

Two functional types were specified for the ACBM. The Type I ACBM, with a complement of 24 independent mechanisms, can be found either axially or radially oriented on the parent module.  It can face any of the six orbital orientations, so can be anywhere within a wide range of temperatures at the start of berthing operations.

Four of the components are mechanisms that can be deployed to get out of the incoming module's way. Others are removed by the crew after the vestibule is pressurized. The Type II is used where ports would otherwise be exposed for long periods of time, or in directions that experience aggressive pre-berth conditions. The Type II ACBM is found on the radial ports of resource nodes, and can face in any orbital orientation.

The PCBM incorporates fittings and alignment structures corresponding to those on the Type I ACBM.  32 of the fittings are themselves spring-loaded mechanisms, actuated during capture and rigidization by corresponding components of the ACBM. The primary CBM/CBM seal is also part of the PCBM, as are preloaded stand-off/push-off springs to stabilize its relative motion when the CBM/CBM joint is nearly mated.

Two types were specified for the PCBM, differing only in the durability of their seal.  The S383 silicon material of the Type I PCBM seal is more forgiving of pre-berth temperature differential between the two modules than the V835 fluorocarbon of the Type II.  S383 is also more resistant to atomic oxygen encountered on orbit prior to berthing. The Type II was used to launch small elements in the shuttle payload bay while bolted to an ACBM or to similar flight-support equipment because the V835 material is more resistant to the damaging effects of scrubbing under vibration.

The PCBM is always located on an end of the parent module. It can be attached to a bulkhead or as an end ring on a barrel section of primary structure that is open to vacuum before berthing. By the nature of the operation, the PCBM always faces in the flight orientation opposite that of the ACBM, so the temperature differentials can be significant.

Operations
See the Operations Gallery for more graphics.  See the Missions Table for individual berthing events.

Post-launch

ACBMs require EVA to prepare for first use on orbit.  Type I ACBMs, usually found on axial ports, typically have a "shower cap" cover that takes two EVA crew members about 45 minutes to remove and stow.  Type II ACBMs, found on Node Radial Ports, require release of launch restraints for the Deployable M/D Covers.  Release of the spring-loaded covers requires actuation of Capture Latches to close them again afterwards and, therefore, exercises the Ready-to-Latch Indicators.  Including inspection, each Radial Port is budgeted about 15 minutes for a single EVA crew member, assisted by IVA crew to operate the ACBM as necessary.

Full-sized elements launched on the NSTS had protective covers over the seal on the PCBM.  Two EVA crew members required 40 – 50 minutes each to remove and stow the PCBM's covers, inspecting the seal as they did so, and cleaning it if necessary.  Type II PCBMs used as a launch interface were inspected after unbolting, since no covers were installed.  For logistics flights, inspection is by camera only.

Berthing

Preparation

The PCBM requires no preparation for berthing beyond what is required post-launch.  Preparation of the ACBM for berthing takes about an hour, beginning with selection of supporting utilities (power, data) and sequential activation for each Controller Panel Assembly (CPA). Two CPAs are selected as the Primary and Secondary Master Controllers.

Activation executes Built-in-Test and initializes position counters for the actuators.  Each bolt actuator is extended two revolutions, then retracted three to verify operability of both the bolt and the motor.  Latches are driven one at a time to the open position which, for Node Radial Ports, deploys M/D Covers. All 20 actuators are set to the operational initial positions (0 revolutions for the bolts, 202° for latches). A remote inspection is conducted to verify that the latches are fully deployed and the mating corridor and surface are clear of obstructions.

Contingencies considered during preparation include cleaning the face of the ACBM ring, and EVA corrective actions involving the M/D Covers as well as the CPA, Capture Latch, and Ready-to-Latch Indicators.  Specific resolution procedures are available for the loss of power and communications support to the CBM.

Maneuver
The PCBM-equipped module is maneuvered into the capture envelope by a tele-robotically operated Remote Manipulator System (RMS).  Two different RMSs have been used to berth modules: the 6-joint Shuttle RMS (SRMS, or "Canadarm") and the 7-joint Space Station RMS (SSRMS, "Canadarm2").

The maneuver operation starts with acquisition of the payload by the RMS End Effector.  This step is variously referred to as "capture" or "grappling".  During the NSTS era, payloads typically arrived in the Shuttle's Payload Bay.  During grapple, the SRMS' joints were "limped", allowing it to conform its posture to the exact location of the payload.  The SSRMS typically grapples a free-flying payload that has maneuvered itself to maintain a constant distance and orientation with respect to the ISS.  Once grappled, the RMS moves the module by changing its joint angles. The motion of the module must often be choreographed with other moving parts of the ISS such as the Solar Arrays.
Visual feedback on the motion of the PCBM has been provided to the RMS operator by at least two dedicated systems.  Early berths were guided using a photogrammetric feedback technique called the Space Vision System (SVS), that was quickly determined unsuitable for general use.  The SVS was replaced by a task-dedicated Centerline Berthing Camera System (CBCS), first used on STS-98.

The time required to complete the RMS maneuver depends entirely on the trajectory to be followed and on any operational constraints that must be accommodated.  The same is true for all contingency planning.  Near the end of the maneuver, the operator negotiates a tight corridor as the PCBM begins to mesh with the ACBM.  The operation ends when the RMS Operator either sees four Ready-to-Latch indications on the target ACBM, or concludes that only three can be achieved.  Because the RTL is a spring-loaded mechanism, the RMS ends up with stored energy and is left in a state that can resist the separating force.

Mate

The two halves of the CBM are nominally joined in three operations:
Capture acquires and aligns the in-coming PCBM with respect to the geometry of the ACBM
Nut Acquisition threads each Powered Bolt into its respective nut
Boltup fully preloads the joint between the two halves

At least two distinct capture protocols have been executed on orbit.  Both protocols issue a "first-stage" capture command to an indicated shaft angle between 185° and 187°.  First-stage capture ensures that each latch is positioned above its respective fitting, which is operationally verified by evaluating its switch state.  The RMS still controls the position and orientation of the element, and the loads exerted by the Capture Latches remain low.  Taking about 15 seconds to complete, first-stage capture is restricted to orbital regions where ground controllers can monitor progress in near real time.  To control spurious loads when the berthing element is large, the station Attitude Control System may be maintained in free-drift and crew exercise prohibited.

The two protocols differ in how the latches draw the two halves to within reach of the Powered Bolts.  During the NSTS era, a single second-stage "capture" command was issued after the SRMS was placed in "test mode".  Five stages of capture are executed when using the SSRMS in order to limit the potential for loads building up in its arm booms if off-nominal braking events occur.  In either case, capture drives latches to 12° indicated shaft angle in an actuation time of about 108 seconds.  In both protocols, the residual energy in the RTLs might cause them to open briefly because the latches are not "hooked" to their fittings until well below the 187° starting position.

As the Thermal Standoffs begin to contact their respective Strike Plates, the resulting load is reported by each bolt's Load Cell. This "ABOLT" phase terminates individually for each bolt on the basis of torque, revolutions, or indicated load. Bolts finishing earlier can see their indicated load change as subsequent bolts seat their nuts. The operators, who might be ground-based, evaluate the resulting condition to determine whether the loading condition is acceptable. If so, restrictions are lifted on Attitude Control and exercise. The RMS releases (ungrapples) the payload and can proceed to other tasks.

If pre-mission Thermal Analysis indicates that the temperature differential between the two CBM halves is excessive, the ABOLT condition is held for an extended period of time.  The "thermal hold" allows the two sides to approach a common temperature.  The Powered Bolts are then tightened in six steps to their full preload.  Each command is issued to four bolts at a time, spaced at 90° intervals.  Some steps may, at the discretion of the operator, be executed more than once.  The final boltup actuation is budgeted for 60 minutes, but can vary quite a bit depending on how many iterations of incremental preload are executed.

Once the operator determines the boltup process to have completed successfully, the latches are commanded to the "closed" position and the CPAs are deactivated.  Power, executive command, and data resources are available for reassignment to other tasks.

Accommodations for several off-nominal situations are inherent in the design of the CBM.  Any single bolt failure during the mating operation can be accommodated by the CBM/CBM seal, still permitting the vestibule to hold atmospheric pressure.  Any two bolt failures can tolerate mechanical loads, provided they are not next to each other and the vestibule is not pressurized.  The loss of any single latch and any single Ready-to-Latch indicator can be tolerated without jeopardizing mission success, and the latches themselves are designed to accommodate the possibility for "brakes on" failure modes in the SRMS.  Detailed resolution logic for the loss of power and communication is available, as are resolution sequences for latches that "miss" their fittings or jam at a partial stroke.  The contingency procedures in this phase of operations also address abnormal braking of the SSRMS and "rapid safing" if other systems in the ISS or Shuttle required immediate departure.

IVA Operations

Vestibule outfitting includes equipment setup, leak check, and mechanical reconfiguration.  The time and effort required depends on the configuration of the ACBM, the number and type of CBM components to be removed, and on the interfaces to be connected between the two elements.  It may be budgeted for as much as ten hours although, in at least some cases, that time might be paused to conduct an extended "fine leak check" by  before opening the hatch into the vestibule.

Because they overlap the crew corridor through the vestibule, the CPAs must always be cleared away, and it is always necessary to remove any covers across the hatch on the newly berthed element.  Where the elements will remain mated for long periods of time, other CBM components may be removed for safe storage or reuse.  Node radial ports require an additional 20–40 minutes for the removal and storage of the M/D Cover's Center section.  A closeout panel is typically installed around the inner perimeter of the two facing hatch beams, to mitigate the gradual collection of debris around the perimeter of the vestibule.

Detailed contingency operations, addressing both repair and preventive maintenance, were prepared in advance for the internally accessible components.  Generalized procedures for pinpointing atmospheric leakage in the vestibule have existed since at least ISS Assembly Stage 4A, as have contingency installation procedures for all three sets of IVA seals.  Reports of damage to CPA connectors (both on the ground and on orbit) led to the deployment of risk mitigation procedures on STS-126.

Deberthing

Removal of an Element essentially reverses the process of berthing.  It varies by the specifics of how the vestibule was configured for operations.  The most commonly encountered implementation starts with deoutfitting the vestibule when reconfiguring to deberth a logistics element a from Node Radial Port.  The procedure was originally budgeted for two crew members and a duration of 4 hours.  It removes items that cross the ACBM/PCBM interface plan (closeouts, utility jumpers, and grounding straps), installs CBM hardware essential to demate operations (e.g., CPA, thermal covers), and closes the hatch.

Pressure decay testing equipment, including sensors and supporting electronics and a Vacuum Access Jumper  in length, are subsequently installed on the inside of the hatch. With these in place, the vestibule is ready for a depressurization period of about 40 minutes, including dwell periods for leak check.

As in pre-berth preparation, supporting utilities are configured to provide for power and data to the CBM.  Power is applied, two CPAs are selected for use as the Primary and Secondary master controllers, and the individual motor controllers are initialized.  A "DBBoltck" command is issued to the Powered Bolts, and the Capture Latches are individually commanded to 212° shaft angle.  The latches are then positioned to their nominal "capture complete" position of 12°.  The CBM is either left in a "standby" condition, or powered down.

Release of the PCBM Element from the hard mated condition takes about 90 minutes.  It begins with loosening of all 16 Powered Bolts by about 0.4 revolutions, taking less than five minutes.  All 16 bolts are required to have a positive residual load after the step is complete.  Sets of four bolts are then extracted completely, each set taking about 6:30 to reach a nominal position of 21.6 revolutions.  RMS grapple and free drift Attitude Control are required to be in place before removal of the third set.  After all 16 bolts have been extracted, the Capture Latches are deployed, allowing the compressed Ready-to-Latch Indicators to thrust against the PCBM's Alignment Guides.  The departing element is maneuvered away by the RMS and, on Node Radial Ports, the Deployable M/D Covers are closed.  The ACBM is then shut down by removing power from the CPAs.

Resolution for contingencies during demate are generally similar to those for preparation and execution of mating operations.  Many of them effectively terminate with instructions for a contingency reberth to allow removal and replacement of CBM components.  The effort to re-outfit the vestibule for de-berthing the CBM makes it generally unsuitable for emergency departure.

Opportunities

The original design of the ISS called for a Habitat element to be installed on the Nadir-facing port of Node 1 (Unity), and bulkhead penetrations were designed accordingly.  As the station matured through the first phases of assembly, Node 3 was planned for that location.  It later became apparent that installation on the port-side bulkhead would confer significant operational advantages.  Unfortunately, the original routing of utilities inside Node 1 required significant re-work on orbit to enable the change.  The large CBM diameter permitted the use of PMA3 as a pressure-containing closeout during the effort, so that feed-throughs could be removed and replaced without EVA.  PMA3 was moved during Expedition 21 to the port-side CBM, and "...Potable Water, ISL & 1553 data cabling, and installing IMV [Inter-Modular Ventilation] ducting, cables and hoses..." were connected in preparation for the arrival of Node 3.  The reconfigured bulkhead was tested for leakage before moving PMA3 back to its storage location, and Node 3 was installed in the newly prepared location on STS-130.

The depth, diameter, and accessibility of the CBM have also been exploited in support of dispensing CubeSats from the SlingShot deployment system.  The framework mounts into the PCBM's interior envelope on logistics vehicles (e.g., Cygnus).  The Bishop NanoRacks Airlock Module takes advantage of the robust interface between the ACBM and PCBM to repeatedly berth and deberth a "bell" hosting similar capability.

Developmental history

Although not the first mechanism developed specifically for berthing, the CBM was the first such device designed in the US specifically to assemble structural joints that would hold sea-level pressure. It integrates four archetypical features:

 experience internal pressure in addition to their other primary loads.  They're considered life critical when used as the pressure hull of a crewed compartment.  In that context, they receive special attention for issues like loads, leak rate, seal redundancy, and verification practices.  They also draw close scrutiny to the effects of their failure.
 External flanges are subject to both mechanical loads and loads induced by pressure in their parent .  The relative stiffness of the flange determines how the free end will change shape.  Distortions must be accommodated when something is being attached at the flange.
 transmit forces differently as their posture changes.  Their loads are influenced by internal friction, and often require more iterations of analysis and design than structures.  In the case of CBM, the load path includes both the module and the RMS, so can be very complicated.
Structural joints that resist high vacuum are engineered to strictly limit gaps across the joint, and the conditions under which they are assembled are carefully managed.  For the CBM, these issues are compounded during boltup by seal scrubbing as pre-berth deflections are conformed, and by any dust and debris trapped in the joint.

The use of these features on a spacecraft entails special considerations due to the aggressive environment.  At the  typical ISS altitude, NASA identifies seven factors for that environment: 

The composition, properties, and condition of the ambient neutral atmosphere.  In particular, Atomic Oxygen (AO) is highly corrosive to many materials.  Elastomers, such as the PCBM's face seal, are particularly sensitive to AO.  Low pressure and low absolute humidity also impact the coefficient of friction for many material combinations.  Exposure to very low pressures also changes the chemical composition of certain materials over time.	
Strongly directional sources and sinks of radiant energy.  The mounting, optical properties, and insulation of exposed spacecraft components are engineered to maintain acceptable temperatures.  In some cases, the orbital orientation of an entire spacecraft is dynamically controlled to mitigate these effects.
The geomagnetic field can interfere with sensitive electrical components (such as those of the ACBM's sensors, switches, and controllers).  The effects can include outright failure as the components are carried through the field.
Ionized gasses that contaminate and charge exposed surfaces, of which the CBM has many.  Most spacecraft deal with this issue by careful grounding of the exposed components.
Electromagnetic radiation that can alter the energy state of electrons in powered equipment.  The motors, sensors, and control electronics such as those on the ACBM are susceptible to these effects unless shielded.
Meteoroids and orbiting debris, some of which can be both heavy and fast-moving, that can strike the spacecraft.  Although the CBM design has been augmented several different ways in this regard, the issue was engineered at the integrated spacecraft level; quantitative requirements are not allocated in either CBM specification.
The balance between gravitational and centrifugal accelerations (often referred to as “zero gravity”), which has substantial implications for verifying the motion of mechanisms on the ground because gravity dominates there.  CBM followed typical spacecraft engineering practice, iterating between analysis and test to develop and verify designs for this condition.

Several of these features and factors interacted through a long sequence of decisions about the station's orbit, configuration, plans for growth, launch vehicles, and assembly techniques.  The berthing operation finds its origin in programs of the 1960s and 1970s as they explored the practicality of physics related to these issues.  The CBM concept itself began to emerge with the first studies of the program in the early 1980s, experienced multiple iterations of concept, and completed development shortly before launch of the first flight element as the 1990s drew to a close.

Origins (prior to c. 1984)
The CBM is just one branch in the long evolution of the United States' ability to assemble large spacecraft. At least as early as the late 1950s, the capability had been recognized as “...necessary for building space stations and assembling vehicles in low Earth orbit...”.  By the end of the Apollo program, standardized  and  practices to support it had been proven in practice.  The basic challenges of propellant management were well understood, as were control stability and contamination issues resulting from the   plumes hitting the  vehicle during .

The advent of the Space Shuttle Program mitigated some issues with docking, but introduced new ones.  Significant differences between the masses of chase and target vehicles provided for less equal sharing of momentum after contact, and the larger mass of the Shuttle required significantly more braking propellant than was needed during Apollo.  Simple coaxial alignment between chase and target inertial properties during terminal approach operations was not possible with the asymmetric Orbiter, which was designed for aerodynamic lift during return from orbit.  Impingement of large Shuttle RCS plumes on relatively small target vehicles also disturbed control over target orientation during proximity operations.  These issues forced changes in braking strategy on the Shuttle program.  Not all strategies were easily implemented in all orbital directions, which threatened the ability to assemble in some of those directions.  The use of a long tele-robotic device (the RMS) reduced that threat by moving the point of first touch away from the chase vehicle.

By 1972, requirements analysis for the Shuttle Program estimated that almost 40% of mission objectives would involve assembly by placing a payload into the Orbiter's Payload Bay.  It was envisioned at that time that many of the retrieved spacecraft would not be designed for such operations, further raising the importance of solving (or eliminating) issues with docking.  The berthing operation was developed to do so: a requirement to gently grasp a nearby spacecraft with near-zero contact velocity was allocated to the Shuttle's planned RMS.  Using the RMS to assemble objects on orbit was regarded as a driving requirement for accuracy in both position and orientation of the emerging system.

Although not foreseen at the time of RMS development, this period saw the emergence of requirement topics that would become important to the CBM: the accuracy and precision of RMS control, limitations on its ability to force things into alignment, and the magnitude of structural loads peaking in the booms and joints during capture.  These proved to be crucial to the design, qualification, and operation of the mechanism's development.

The SRMS did not accomplish its first retrieval and payload bay berth until STS-7 in June, 1983.  The date of first operation was two months after submission of final reports by the eight contractors of NASA's Space Station Needs, Attributes, and Architectural Options Study.  Even though no flight results were available when the final study reports were written, at least three of them identified “berthing” as the primary means of assembling a Space Station from pressurized modules delivered in the Shuttle's payload bay.  Of the concepts described and illustrated, none strongly resemble the eventual design of the CBM, and little discussion of the technical details is readily available.

In early 1984, the Space Station Task Force described a Berthing Mechanism that would attenuate the loads incurred when two modules were maneuvered into contact with each other, followed by latching. Contact conditions were identified as important, but were not quantified at that time. The same is true for the diameter of the internal passageway. A standardized Berthing Mechanism was perceived as an external flange on module ports, and a “6-port Multiple Berthing Adapter” roughly corresponded to the eventual Resource Node concept. Deflections induced by internal pressure acting on radially-oriented ports of cylindrical modules became recognized as a critical developmental issue. The Task Force's final report also appears to be among the earliest references to “common...berthing mechanisms”.

Advanced Development/Phase B (c. 1985 – c. 1988)

In parallel with the on-going system-level configuration studies, NASA anticipated that concept development projects for advanced docking and berthing mechanisms “...to substantially reduce docking loads (velocities less than 0.1 ft/sec) and provide payload berthing capabilities...will be initiated beginning in Fiscal Year 1984.”

The Berthing Mechanism Advanced Development program actually started in 1985, leading to full-scale testing in the Six-Degree-of-Freedom test facility at Marshall Spaceflight Center (MSFC).  In that effort, “common” appears to have meant that a single family of mechanism designs accomplished both berthing and docking (inheriting the divergent requirements for both) and that any member of the family could join with any other member.  “Active” and “passive” referred to whether mechanisms were provided for attenuation of residual kinetic energy after docking.  Motor-deployed capture latches of two different designs (fast- and slow-acting, having short- and long-reach, respectively) were mounted on the outboard radius.  Outward-oriented guide petals were also located on the outboard radius, giving the mechanism an overall diameter of about 85 inches.

Structural latching was accomplished by a “bolt/nut structural latch” of 0.500 inch nominal diameter. Bolt/nut locations alternated in orientation around the perimeter of the 63-inch diameter pressure wall and the faces of both rings included seals, so that the mechanism was effectively androgynous at the assembly level. The bolts were designed for manual actuation, using sealed drive penetrations through the bulkhead. An option for motorized torquing was identified, but not designed. The bolt could be tightened from either the head side, or the nut side.

One of the study's four variants incorporated an aluminum bellows, allowing a loop of modules to be closed.  Tension loads caused by internal pressure were carried across the bellows by a continuous cable loop threaded through 47 pulleys arrayed around the outside of the bellows.  Not all of the issues with the bellows design appear to have been fully resolved by the end of the developmental test series.

Although the dimensions accommodated internal utility connections and a 50-inch square hatchway, the mechanism envelope had limited compatibility with the eventual recessed Radial Port locations on USOS Resource Nodes. The apparent incompatibility with Radial Port locations might be explained by the as-yet unstable configuration of the Nodes, being shown as spherical 10-ports modules in some configurations, but cylindrical 3-port modules in others.  Many other features of the baseline station configuration of the time also appear quite different from the eventual ISS.

Space Station Freedom (c.1989 – c.1992)

As 1990 approached, the size of the CBM had been stabilized by a specific Engineering approach to the design of modules.  Indirectly constrained by the circular cross-section of the NSTS Payload Bay, the internal volume of the module was divided into eleven regions.  A center aisle running the length of the module is surrounded by four banks of equipment.  The equipment banks meet along four lines running nearly the full length of the pressure shell.  Immediately outboard of those points, wedge-shaped utility volumes run parallel to the aisle.  The utility runs allow them to be tapped from many stations along their length.  Other equipment, some of which facilitated utility connection between modules after they're mated on orbit, is more efficiently packaged in the endcone volumes than in the cylindrical portion of the module.  Penetrations for these utility runs to connect between modules received significant attention in the layout of the vestibule and, therefore, of the CBM.

Each bank of equipment was divided into “racks” of standard size that could be installed on orbit in order to repair, upgrade or extend the station's capability.  Racks holding related equipment could be integrated and  Tested on the ground before launch.  This approach to integration facilitated a higher level of verification than would have been available using replacement of smaller components, providing for “...easy reconfiguration of the modules over their life span of 30 years.”  It also permitted the architecture to accommodate the subsequent change in orbital inclination by moving some of the heavy racks off the initial launch of the module. The distinctive size and shape of both the common hatch and CBM enabled this concept of module integration because they permitted movement of the large racks into, and out of, the modules while on orbit.

Other system-level decisions in this time frame also affected the eventual design of the CBM.  The idea of a “common” mechanism for both docking and berthing appears to have been discarded, and major mechanisms specific to each of those distinct operations were identified.  The concept of a “common” module pressure shell with a range of Radial Port configurations, still being studied by NASA at least as late as 1991, was discarded in favor of dedicated “Resource Nodes” having four Radial Ports near one end of a cylindrical pressure shell.  Closure of the “module pattern” was deferred from the initial system-level design by 1992, eliminating the bellows-based variant of the PCBM.

By the early 1990s, a more detailed picture of the CBM began to emerge. The initial release of the PCBM development specification was in October 1991, followed by that of the CBM/PE ICD in February, 1992 and the ACBM development specification in January, 1993. Several elements of the Advanced Development concept were retained with little change. Both the bolts and the capture latches were motorized with manual backup being available, although the individual mechanisms were still driven by way of sealed couplings that passed through the bulkhead. The term “active” had evolved to mean the co-location of all powered devices on the side of the interface already present on orbit when the mating operation took place.

Other features had been changed more significantly since the Advanced Development concept.  “Androgyny” had been discarded: all 16 bolts were collected on the same side of the CBM/CBM interface, and the nut side was no longer described as being drivable. An 8-channel multiplexing motor controller could be remotely switched between latches, with two controllers required for each module having an ACBM.  Differential pressure sensors had been included to monitor potential leak locations.  Until it was cancelled, the Passive Flexible CBM still had an aluminum bellows, but the cable/pulley concept had been replaced by a set of 16 powered struts, driven by the multiplexing motor controller.  The CBM/CBM seal design was a “face” design, on one side of the interface only.  Alignment guides were deployable, and their orientation was reversed to face inward.  The four capture latches had acquired friction clutches, allowing them to be back-driven.

New features emerged in this time frame.  A debris cover had been added to the ACBM concept.  It was a full-diameter unit of a single piece, removed and replaced with the RMS.  Attachment of the rings to their bulkheads had been defined as a 64-bolt pattern, but no differentiation of the bolt pattern is mentioned in any of the sources.  A shear tie had been added to the design to carry loads parallel to the CBM/CBM interface plane.

Transition to ISS (1993 – c. 1996)

By December 1990, Space Station Freedom's cost estimate had risen from the 1984 estimate of $8 billion to reach $38 billion.  Although the estimate was reduced to $30 billion by March of the following year, calls to restructure or cancel the program were prominent in Congress.  In March 1993, NASA Administrator Dan S. Goldin communicated that President Clinton wanted “...the current Space Station redesigned as part of a program that is more efficient and effective...[to]...significantly reduce development, operations, and utilization costs while achieving many of the current goals...”.

The redesign team submitted their final report in June 1993, describing three distinct space station concepts.  Each concept was assessed at orbital inclinations of 28.5 and 51.6 degrees to expose any issues of support from the US and Russian launch complexes, respectively.  None of the three configurations precisely matches the design of the ISS as it exists today, although some of them bore strong resemblance to the eventual configuration.  The CBM was the only explicitly identified structural/mechanical subsystem included in all options at all inclinations. An increased exploitation of vestibule volume for utility connections was recommended for all options in order to decrease EVA time.  Removal of automated controllers, motors, and latch mechanisms was conceptually identified as an option for one of them.

The specific conceptual designs that emerged from the Task Force were soon overcome by events.  By late 1994, the US, Russia, and International Partners agreed in principle to merge their national efforts into a single "international (sic) Space Station" project.  The cooperation led to hybridized assembly operations such as installation of the docking module atop the Orbiter Docking System on STS-74.  This blurred common distinctions between berthing and docking, being positioned by the RMS but actuated by Orbiter thruster firings.

Both CBM specifications were completely re-written in 1995 (PCBM) and 1996 (ACBM) as part of the transition process.  This period also saw the splitting of the ICD into dedicated Part 1 (interface requirements) and Part 2 (physical and functional definition) at Revision D (June 1996).  By the time a final framework for the international effort was contractually established in December 1996, the first CBM simulators had already been delivered to NASA.

Qualification (c. 1994 – 1998)

Having been specified independently, compliance for most requirements of the ACBM and PCBM was verified separately.  In addition to assembly-level activities for the ACBM and PCBM, compliance data were generated for subassemblies such as the Capture Latch, Powered Bolt, Powered Bolt Nut, and Ready to Latch Indicator.  For example, the Powered Bolt and Nut functionality was qualified by component-level tests that included Ambient Functional, Random Vibration, Thermal Vacuum, and, for the bolt, Thermal Cycle.  Load tests at the yield and ultimate static conditions were conducted at the component level, as were dynamic conditions.  The success criteria for these tests were generally based on the torque required to establish and relieve preload, on electrical continuity, and on the accuracy of the bolt's load cell.

In contrast, at least 11 specified verification activities required conjoint verification of mating and/or demating the two sides. For example, the specifications directed capture to be qualified “...by analysis under dynamic loads imposed by the SRMS and SSRMS...validated by assembly-level test that includes variation of performance resulting from temperature and pressure on the ACBM and PCBM and on their interfacing structures.”  Boltup analyses of the ACBM/PCBM interface, and subsequent leakage, required similar validation by element- and assembly-level tests that included the distorting effects of pressure and temperature. End-to-end demonstrations were also required at the assembly level to verify "...mechanical functionality...without interruption from accomplishment of ready-to-latch indication and capture."

Imposing the combined effects of capture dynamics and distortions required iterations of analysis and validating test for each aspect. The dedicated test setup was developed in three parallel threads:

Contact Dynamics analysis of early CBM versions had begun by 1992, and was incorporated into MSFC's RMS Model for use in Boeing's CBM model development tests.  The model was based on the "method of soft constraints", assessing "...intersection or penetration between the corresponding surfaces and calculating mutually perpendicular forces proportional to the depth of penetration".  Preliminary model validation testing for these "rebound" forces and subsequent accelerations was conducted in MSFC's Contact Dynamics Laboratory from 1992 through at least 1997.  The loads were locally linearized and imposed on the back end of a PCBM test article in the conjoint tests and demonstrations by a counter-balanced "Resistive Load System" suspended from the top of MSFC's V20 Vacuum Chamber.

Temperature predictions were based on standard thermal analysis modeling techniques.  The model was validated by stand-alone Thermal Balance testing of both assemblies at AEDC's 12V Thermal Vacuum/Solar Simulation Chamber in 1995/96.  These ensured use of the correct interface conductances, internal re-radiation, and internal thermal capacitances.  Validation was supported by select contact conductance testing, reducing the number of variables to be resolved in Thermal Balance.  Temperatures were imposed during assembly-level qualification testing by a combination of strip heaters, cryogenic shrouds, and direct LN2 Injection.

Pressure-induced deflections of Pressurized Elements were estimated by Finite Element Modeling of their primary pressure shells, which led to validating pressure tests in mid-1996. For CBM assembly-level testing, the  Active Pressure Vessel (APV) emulated boundary conditions on a flight-like radial port berthing plate. The simpler  Passive Pressure Vessel emulated an axial port. Manufacturing of the APV overlapped with discovery of negative margins in the design of Node 1 radial berthing plates. Redesign of the plate could not be accommodated in the APV's manufacturing schedule. It was compensated for by the relative rotation of nut acquisition commands during test.

Setup for the assembly level test began with chamber modifications in August 1996, with the two pressure vessels being delivered for characterization testing in December.  Integrated checkout of the assembled setup in the V20 chamber began with baseline testing of developmental CBM hardware in August 1997, and was completed in November of that year.  Formal testing ran in three phases from February to September 1998:
Phase A executed 62 boltup cycles under a range of atmospheric and temperature conditions to evaluate leak rates and Powered Bolt/Nut life cycle.

Phase B ran 35 partial cycles (capture and nut acquisition) under an expanded range of temperature conditions.

Phase C conducted five round-trip demonstrations under "challenge" conditions: extreme temperature differentials combined with PCBM positions more distant than those previously executed in hardware.

No leak test was ever failed in this test.  The Contact Dynamics model correlated to the test results with high statistical confidence and was shown to have no discernable sensitivity to deflections.  Wear-out signatures for the Powered Bolt were identified and validated, and several integration issues were identified and resolved through minor re-designs.  Significant issues with test-specific off-loading of gravitational effects were encountered, ultimately leading to changes in flight procedures.  Nominal and contingency procedures were investigated and, in some cases, extensively revised prior to flight operations.

Tests were subsequently conducted in the facility to qualify the IVA seals, and to support resolution of mission operations issues about bolt reach, contact corridors for alignment, RTL clearance, M/D Cover clearance, and RTL activation.  The facility also provided real-time support for the first three flight uses of the CBM to assemble the ISS on orbit.

Field Modifications (c. 2000 - present)

The decision to install Node 3 on the port-facing CBM of Node 1, instead of the originally-planned Nadir-facing orientation, resulted in "...a unique circumstance: an exposed axial port berthing mechanism.  Because this had never been planned for, a new design was developed...similar to the forward facing radial port...to provide a deployable shield to cover the exposed areas."  The unique covers were installed during EVA #4 of Expedition 50.
In late 2017 and early 2018, modifications were made to the attachment of CPAs to the hatch beams on two Nadir-facing ports.  These modification allowed for rotation of CPAs "...into the vestibule rather than requiring that the crew remove them completely after a vehicle arrives.  This will save both crew time and stowage space during a berthed mission.  The CPAs must be installed for proper CBM operation during berthing activities, but they obstruct the pathway into the vehicle once the hatch is opened, so they need to be moved out of the corridor prior to cargo operations."

Galleries

Design

Operations

Missions
Uses of the CBM (as of May 2020) are tabulated below.  Timing for the factory mates of PMA-1 and PMA-2 to Node 1 are approximate.  See  for berths through April, 2015; additional information is available for the Shuttle flights as noted in the PCBM Element column. Later berths are substantiated in the Notes column, as are anomalies and relevant information in NASA flight status reports and other documentation.

Glossary 
Many terms used in the CBM literature are not always consistent with usage in other contexts.  Some were defined specific to the development program.  Definitions are included here to improve continuity with the references, and with other topics.

Notes and citations

References

Reports and other distributions

Key to Organizational Authors and Publishers

Status Pages

External links
 NSTS Mission Pages Mission Statuses are accessible through the "News" links
 ISS On-orbit Status Reports Archives 2006 - July, 2013
 ISS Status Reports Archive for 2009 January - December, 2009
 ISS Status Reports Archive for 2010 January - December, 2010
 ISS Status Reports Archive for 2011 January - August, 2011
 ISS Daily Summary Reports March, 2013 - present
 ISS Status Reports October, 2014 - present
 The National Archives Catalog Searchable for all NSTS photographs of CBM, Vestibule, etc.
 NASA Technical Reports Server (NTRS) Searchable for a wide variety of technical reports issued by NASA organizations and personnel
 Aerospace Safety Advisory Panel Reports 1971 - present
 JSC Mechanical Systems Working Group
 Common Berthing Mechanism Acceptance Test of the Japanese Experiment Module “Kibo”
 Expedition 50, EVA #4 (2017-03-17) Video Archive Extensive high-resolution video showing installation of the unique covers on Node 3's axial ACBM
 Node Structural Test Article internal 720° View Showing the structural elements influencing CBM pre-berth deflections, including end fittings for struts between the ports

See also

Comparison of spacecraft docking and berthing mechanisms

Spacecraft components
Components of the International Space Station
Spacecraft docking systems
Articles containing video clips